Amirabad-e Sukhek (also Romanized as Amīrābād-e Sūkhek; also known as Amīrābād) is a village in Saadatabad Rural District, Pariz District, Sirjan County, Kerman Province, Iran. At the 2006 census, its population was 218, in 52 families.

References 

Populated places in Sirjan County